Kathrin Dienstbier is a German rower, who competed for the SG Dynamo Potsdam / Sportvereinigung (SV) Dynamo. She won the medals at the international rowing competitions.

References 

Year of birth missing (living people)
Living people
East German female rowers
World Rowing Championships medalists for East Germany